Julia Emma Villatoro Tario (born 1972) is an El Salvadoreon diplomat who was Ambassador of El Salvador to the Kingdom of Belgium, Head of Mission to the European Union and to the Grand Duchy of Luxembourg beginning in 2017. She was appointed as Chargée d'Affaires a.i. in June 2016. In 2020, she presented her credentials to Austrian Federal President Alexander Van der Bellen. She was also the Permanent Representative of El Salvador to the United Nations in Vienna.

Life
Tario was born in 1972 in San Salvador.

She was authorised by the Supreme Court in El Salvador as an attorney after she graduated from the Central American University José Simeón Cañas. She joined her country's diplomatic service.

She was appointed as her country's ambassador to the European Union in January 2017. She was based at the embassy in Brussels.

On January 13, 2020, she presented her credentials to Austrian Federal President Alexander Van der Bellen.  She is also the Permanent Representative of El Salvador to the United Nations in Vienna.

Private life
In 2020 Tario was divorced with two children.

References

Living people
Ambassadors of El Salvador to the European Union
1972 births
People from San Salvador
Women ambassadors
Ambassadors of El Salvador to Austria
Permanent Representatives of El Salvador to the United Nations
Ambassadors of El Salvador to Belgium
Ambassadors of El Salvador to Luxembourg